Ana Martínez may refer to:

Ana Lucía Martínez (born 1990), Guatemalan footballer
Ana Martínez (handballer) (born 1991), Spanish handball player